Poliaenus sparsus is a species of beetle in the family Cerambycidae. It was described by Chemsak and Linsley in 1975. It is known from Mexico.

References

Pogonocherini
Beetles described in 1975